Ban Pa is a subdistrict in Mueang Phitsanulok District of Phitsanulok Province, Thailand. In 2022 it had a population of 5,792 and 2,528 households. The economy of this subdistrict is mainly based on agriculture and fishery.

Geography
The topography of Ban Pa is a plain area at the foot of the mountain. The subdistrict is bordered to the north by Wat Bot district, to the east and south by Don Thong subdistrict, to the west by Hua Ro subdistrict and Makham Sung subdistrict. Ban Pa subdistrict lies in the Nan Basin, which is part of the Chao Phraya Watershed.  The Nan River flows west of the subdistrict.

History
The local legend is that it was originally a dense rainforest. In 1821, people from Vientiane province (Laos) arrived in Moo3 and Moo5. In 1832, Thai people settled Ban Laem Rang in Moo1. Later, people from Phichit and Phrae provinces arrived. Original Moo6 was called Ban Tai, Moo7 was called Ban Nuea and Moo7 was called Ban Rai. Today, these three villages are all called Ban Pa. Ultimately, most forest on plains is cleared for agriculture. 

Ban Pa Subdistrict administrative organization - SAO (ongkan borihan suan tambon) was established.

Administration
The administration of Ban Pa SAO is responsible for an area that covers 37,625 rai ~  and consists of 10 administrative villages, as of 2022: 5,792 people and 2,528 households.

Temples
Ban Pa subdistrict is home to the following active temples, where Theravada Buddhism is practiced by local residents:

Infrastructure

Education
The following elementary/secondary schools are located in Ban Pa:
 Ban Bueng Kradan school - Moo3
 Ban Pa school - Moo6
 Ban Dong Wittaya school - Moo9

Healthcare
There is Ban Pa health-promoting hospital in Moo7.

Transportation
Major road is:
 Highway 11, Phitsanulok - Den Chai route.

Electricity
All households in Ban Pa subdistrict have access to the electricity grid of Provincial Electricity Authority (PEA).

Communications
There are more then twenty mobile top-up kiosks and two public phone booths and also one Thai Post office.

Waterworks
All households in Ban Pa subdistrict have access to the water network of Provincial Waterworks Authority (PWA).

Economy
The economy of Ban Pa is mainly based on crop (rice and corn) and livestock (chickens, cattle and pigs) production and fisheries.
The following companies play a role in the employment service:
 Cargill Siam Co. Ltd. - Moo8
 T.P.Pacific Co. Ltd. - Moo8
 Thai Charoen fresh fruit market - Moo6
 Rice mill - Moo3
 Three petrol and gasstations - Moo4, Moo6 and Moo8

Attraction
 Bueng Thung Hong (Thai:บึงทุ่งหงษ์) - Moo1

References

Tambon of Phitsanulok province
Populated places in Phitsanulok province